The 2015 general election took place on 7 May 2015 and saw each of Parliament's 650 constituencies return one Member of Parliament (MP) to the House of Commons. Parliament, which consists of the House of Lords and the elected House of Commons, was convened on 27 May at the Palace of Westminster by Queen Elizabeth II.  It was dissolved just after midnight on 3 May 2017, being 25 working days ahead of the general election on 8 June 2017. The dissolution was originally scheduled for 2020, but took place almost three years early following a call for a snap election by Conservative Prime Minister Theresa May which received the necessary two-thirds majority in a 522 to 13 vote in the House of Commons on 19 April 2017. It was the shortest Parliament since 1974.

The 2015 general election resulted in a Conservative majority, a massive loss of seats for the Liberal Democrats, and all but three Scottish seats going to the SNP.

The UK Independence Party elected their first MP at a general election. The Alliance Party of Northern Ireland and the Respect Party lost their singular seats that they had in the previous Parliament. The Ulster Unionist Party won back representation electing two MPs, having had none in the previous Parliament.

Notable newcomers to enter the House of Commons in this General Election included future Prime Minister Rishi Sunak and Leader of the Labour Party; Keir Starmer, as well as the future parliamentary leaders of the Scottish National Party and Plaid Cymru; Ian Blackford and Liz Saville Roberts.

Other new MPs included; Chris Philp,  Rebecca Long-Bailey, Angela Rayner, Antoinette Sandbach, Mhairi Black, Richard Burgon, Sue Hayman, Joanna Cherry, Oliver Dowden, Andrea Jenkyns, Suella Braverman, Chris Matheson, Amanda Milling, Heidi Allen, Stephen Kinnock, Jess Phillips, Ruth Smeeth, Kelly Tolhurst, Tulip Siddiq, Amanda Solloway, Craig Mackinlay, Alison Thewliss and Clive Lewis.

During the 2015–17 Parliament, John Bercow was the Speaker of the House of Commons, David Cameron and Theresa May served as Prime Minister, and Harriet Harman and Jeremy Corbyn served as Leader of Her Majesty's Most Loyal Opposition.

House of Commons composition
Below is a graphical representation of the House of Commons showing a comparison of party strengths as it was directly after the 2015 general election. This is not a seating plan of the House of Commons, which has five rows of benches on each side, with the government party to the right of the Speaker and opposition parties to the left, but with room for only around two-thirds of MPs to sit at any one time.

This table shows the number of MPs in each party:

Notes
See here for a full list of changes during the fifty-sixth Parliament.
In addition to the parties listed in the table above, the Co-operative Party was also represented in the House of Commons by Labour MPs sitting with the Labour Co-operative designation. The number of these MPs was 24 after the general election, and was 28 at dissolution.
The actual government majority is calculated as Conservative MPs less all other parties. This calculation excludes the Speaker, Deputy Speakers (two Labour and one Conservative) and Sinn Féin (who follow a policy of abstentionism).

List of MPs elected in the general election
The following table is a list of MPs elected, ordered by constituency. Names of incumbents are listed where they stood for re-election; for details of defeated new candidates and the incumbent who stood down in those cases see individual constituency articles.

Notes

Changes and by-elections
After the general election, changes can occur in the composition of the House of Commons. This happens as a result of the election of Deputy Speakers, by-elections, defections, suspensions or removal of whip.

After the swearing in of MPs and the elections of the Speaker and the Deputy Speakers, the initial government majority was calculated to be sixteen.

Technically, MPs cannot resign. However, they can effectively do so by requesting to be appointed as the Crown Steward and Bailiff of the Manor of Northstead or the Crown Steward and Bailiff of the three Chiltern Hundreds of Stoke, Desborough and Burnham, which vacates their seat.

The net outcome of all changes over the course of the Parliament had resulted in two fewer Labour MPs, two fewer SNP MPs, one more Liberal Democrat MP and three more independent MPs.

Deputy Speakers
In accordance with a decision taken by the House of Commons on the final day of its sitting in the previous Parliament, the Speaker appointed two members to serve as Temporary Deputy Speakers until the Deputy Speakers had been elected. Directly after the 2015 State Opening of Parliament, the Speaker nominated Sir Roger Gale (Conservative, North Thanet) and George Howarth (Labour, Knowsley) for these positions.

The election of Deputy Speakers took place on 3 June 2015.

Although Deputy Speakers do not resign from their parties, they cease to vote (except to break ties) and they do not participate in party-political activity until the next election.

By-elections

By-elections are held for seats that become vacant.

A by-election was planned to be held in the seat of Manchester Gorton following the death of Sir Gerald Kaufman on 26 February 2017. Following the announcement on 18 April 2017 of a snap general election by Theresa May, it was confirmed that the Cabinet Office would intervene to cancel the by-election, leaving the seat vacant until the general election on 8 June 2017.

Defections, suspensions and removal of whip
In some situations, the label under which MPs sit in the House of Commons can change. When this happens, MPs often become independents.

Progression of government majority and party totals 
The government voting total is the total number of Conservative MPs, minus the Conservative Deputy Speaker. The opposition voting total is the total number of other MPs, minus the Speaker, the two Labour Deputy Speakers, and all Sinn Féin MPs. The majority is the difference between the former and the latter.

See also
Members of the House of Lords
List of MPs for constituencies in England 2015–17
List of MPs for constituencies in Scotland 2015–17
List of MPs for constituencies in Northern Ireland 2015–17
List of MPs for constituencies in Wales 2015–17
List of United Kingdom MPs by seniority, 2015–17
:Category:UK MPs 2015–2017

References

UK MPs
2015 United Kingdom general election
2015